Pernilla Bowall (born ) is a Swedish former football player who played for the Sweden women's national football team. She represented Sweden at the 1996 Summer Olympics.

Career statistics

International

References

External links
 
 
 Profile at SvenskFotboll.se

1972 births
Living people
Swedish women's footballers
Place of birth missing (living people)
Olympic footballers of Sweden
Footballers at the 1996 Summer Olympics
Sweden women's international footballers
Women's association football midfielders